The Sound of 65 is the debut album by rhythm & blues/jazz group The Graham Bond Organisation and featuring its best-known line-up of Graham Bond on vocals, alto saxophone, Hammond B-3 organ and Mellotron, Jack Bruce on vocals, acoustic and electric basses and harmonica, Dick Heckstall-Smith on tenor and soprano saxophone and Ginger Baker on drums.

Melody Maker'''s Chris Welch has suggested The Sound of '65 "may have been the greatest album of the Sixties" and "one of the most exciting and influential of its time" given the respect paid by luminaries like Steve Winwood and Bill Bruford. This album and the group's second and last, There's a Bond Between Us'' are now considered "essential listening for anyone who is seriously interested in either British blues, The Rolling Stones' early sound, or the history of popular music, in England or America, during the late '50s and early '60s" and is also known among fans of Cream, which Bond's rhythm section joined in the next year.

Track listing
Side A
 "Hoochie Koochie Man" (Willie Dixon) - 3:11
 "Baby Make Love to Me" (Janet Godfrey, John Group) - 1:49
 "Neighbour, Neighbour" (Alton Joseph Valier) - 2:37
 "Early in the Morning" (Traditional, arranged by Group) - 1:47
 "Spanish Blues" (Graham Bond) - 3:03
 "Oh Baby" (Bond) - 2:39
 "Little Girl" (Bond) - 2:11

Side B
 "I Want You" (Bond) - 1:43
 "Wade in the Water" (Traditional, arranged by Group and Paul Getty) - 2:39
 "Got My Mojo Working" (McKinley Morganfield) - 3:08
 "Train Time" (Group) - 2:21
 "Baby Be Good to Me" (Godfrey, Group) - 2:21
 "Half a Man" (Bond) - 2:02
 "Tammy" (Jay Livingston, Ray Evans) - 2:46

Personnel
 Graham Bond - Hammond organ, vocals, Mellotron, alto saxophone
 Dick Heckstall-Smith - tenor saxophone
 Jack Bruce - electric and acoustic basses, vocals, harmonica
 Ginger Baker - drums

References

External links

1965 debut albums
The Graham Bond Organisation albums
Columbia Records albums